Grzybowo  is a village in the administrative district of Gmina Kołobrzeg, within Kołobrzeg County, West Pomeranian Voivodeship, in northwestern Poland. It is located on the Trzebiatowski Coast.

The village has a population of 1,347.

References

Grzybowo
Populated coastal places in Poland
Seaside resorts in Poland